"Take the Long Way Home" is the third US single and sixth track of English rock band Supertramp's 1979 album Breakfast in America. It was the last song written for the album, being penned during the nine-month recording cycle. In 1980, the live version from Paris became a minor hit in various European countries.

Background
According to its composer Roger Hodgson, the song deals with how the desire to go home can go both ways:
I'm talking about not wanting to go home to the wife, take the long way home to the wife because she treats you like part of the furniture, but there's a deeper level to the song, too. I really believe we all want to find our home, find that place in us where we feel at home, and to me, home is in the heart and that is really, when we are in touch with our heart and we're living our life from our heart, then we do feel like we found our home."

This was the last song composed for Breakfast in America.

Reception
Billboard magazine contributor David Farrell praised the "convincing melody with a crafty hook", although he felt the music contrasted with the "pessimistic lyric about man's loss of identity in an increasingly complex world."  Cash Box called it "a bouncy, uptempo number, laden with pop-symphonic instrumentals, highpitched vocals and harmonies and a jaunty harmonic figure"  Record World said that "brisk keyboards slice through the bouncy rhythm and trademark vocals." 

Ultimate Classic Rock critic Nick DeRiso rated it as Supertramp's 8th best song.  Gary Graff of Billboard rated "Take the Long Way Home" as Supertramp's 7th best song, noting its "bouncy melody awash with keyboards" and the "rich sax-and-harmonica exchange between [John] Helliwell and [Rick] Davies."

The single reached number 10 on the U.S. charts and number 4 in the Canadian charts.

Charts

Personnel
Roger Hodgson — vocals, piano, electric guitar
Rick Davies — harmonica, Hammond organ, synthesizers
Dougie Thomson — bass guitar
Bob C. Benberg — drums, tambourine
John Helliwell — synthesizer, clarinet solo

Other versions
 The band Trixter included a version of the song on their 1994 release Undercovers.
 Alternative rock band Lazlo Bane covered the song for their 2007 cover album Guilty Pleasures.

References

External links
 Supertramp - Take the Long Way Home

1979 singles
1970s ballads
Supertramp songs
Songs written by Roger Hodgson
Rock ballads
A&M Records singles